BOC Aviation is a majority state-owned global aircraft operating leasing company and the largest aircraft operating leasing company headquartered in Asia, as measured by the value of owned aircraft.

BOC Aviation is listed on the Hong Kong Stock Exchange and has its headquarters in Singapore with offices in Dublin, London, New York and Tianjin.

History

The history dates back to 1993 when the company was founded as Singapore Aircraft Leasing Enterprise Pte. Ltd. (SALE) by Singapore Airlines Limited and Boullioun Aviation Services, Inc., a U.S.-based aircraft operating leasing company.  In 1995 acquired its first owned aircraft and in 1996 placed the first order with Airbus. In 1997, the company's shareholder base was broadened when Temasek Holdings (Private) Limited and Government of Singapore Investment Corporation Private Limited joined the founders as investors.

In 2000, the company was reported to be the largest customer of the Airbus' single-aisle aircraft in Asia.

In July 2004, Singapore Aircraft Leasing Enterprise (SALE) underwent a change in its shareholder structure, following the transfer of the 35.5% stake held by Seattle-based Boullioun Aviation Services to the US lessor's parent company WestLB AG of Germany. Boullioun was a 100% subsidiary of WestLB from 2001, until 2005 when it was sold to Aviation Capital Group. The remaining ownership then of SALE was unchanged, with Singapore Airlines (SIA) holding 35.5%, and Singapore government investment agencies GIC and Temasek Holdings each retaining 14.5%.

In December 2006, the company was acquired by, and became a wholly owned subsidiary of, Bank of China. At the time, the company was the largest aircraft leasing company in Asia. Following the acquisition the company's name was changed to BOC Aviation Pte. Ltd. in 2007.

Bank of China bought the company's shares for US$965million. Thus, to reflect the change in ownership, the company was renamed BOC Aviation on 2 July 2007.

On 12 May 2016, the company was converted to a public company limited by shares and the company's name was changed to BOC Aviation Limited.

On 1 June 2016, the company was listed on the Main Board of the Stock Exchange of Hong Kong.

Partnership
In August 2019, BOC Aviation signed a purchase-and-leaseback agreement with Qatar Airways, the state-owned flag carrier of Qatar, for three new Airbus A350 twin-aisle aircraft to be delivered by the end of the third quarter.

External links

References

Aerospace companies of Singapore
Bank of China
Aircraft leasing companies
Companies listed on the Hong Kong Stock Exchange
Government-owned companies of China